Romolo Casamonica (born 23 December 1962) is an Italian former professional boxer who competed from 1985 to 1996. As an amateur, he competed in the men's light middleweight event at the 1984 Summer Olympics.

References

External links
 
 

1962 births
Living people
Italian male boxers
Olympic boxers of Italy
Boxers at the 1984 Summer Olympics
Boxers from Rome
Competitors at the 1983 Mediterranean Games
Mediterranean Games bronze medalists for Italy
Mediterranean Games medalists in boxing
Light-middleweight boxers